Knut Kiesewetter (13 September 1941 – 28 December 2016) was a German jazz musician, singer, songwriter, and producer.

Kiesewetter was born in Stettin (Szczecin). He began his career in the age of 14, playing trombone and singing. He issued his first single at the age of 19. As a songwriter, his songs were recorded by Gitte Haenning and Eartha Kitt, among others. As a producer he worked together with Hannes Wader, Volker Lechtenbrink, and Fiede Kay. He became very popular throughout the 1970s with his songs in Low German, such as "Fresenhof" and "De Möhl".

He taught at the Hochschule für Musik und Theater Hamburg. Kiesewetter died on 28 December 2016 at the age of 75.

Discography 
 1964: Songs und Balladen (mit Hartmut und Sigrun Kiesewetter)
 1964: Halleluja - Deutsche Spirituals (Polydor)
 1968: The Gospel Train
 1968: Happy Dixie
 1972: Das darf doch nicht wahr sein (Somerset)
 1972: Die besten Ostfriesenwitze vertellt vun Knut Kiesewetter
 1973: Ihr solltet mich nicht vergessen (BASF)
 1974: Keiner hat mich richtig lieb (Polydor)
 1976: Leeder vun mien Fresenhof (Polydor)
 1976: Vom Traum ein großer Mann zu sein
 1978: Wo büst du ween
 1980: Jazz Again (Polydor)
 1982: So sing ich nur für dich
 1987: Wiehnachtstied op uns Fresenhof
 1989: Wenn man nicht in ist (BMG Ariola)
 1991: Morgenlicht (Dino, Knut Kiesewetter und Familie)
 2005: Wiehnachtstied (4 CD)
 2007: 50 Years on Stage (4 CD)

References

External links 
 
www.knutkiesewetter.de - Official Homepage
NFR – Nordfriesland Records

1941 births
2016 deaths
Musicians from Szczecin
German singer-songwriters
German songwriters
German jazz trombonists
Male trombonists
People from the Province of Pomerania
German male jazz musicians